Alshaun Gerswon Bock (born 16 May 1982) is a South African rugby union player who last played for the  in the Currie Cup and in the Rugby Challenge. His regular position is winger.

Career

He was also called up to the South Africa Sevens team for the Hong Kong Sevens in the same year.

Another season at Boland Cavaliers followed before he joined  in 2005, where he had a successful two seasons. A solitary first class performance for  followed in 2009, but he spent most of his time playing club rugby for the Hamiltons RFC in Cape Town.

He was given a two-year contract extension in 2013.

In 2013, he was included in a South Africa President's XV team that played in the 2013 IRB Tbilisi Cup and won the tournament after winning all three matches.

Griquas

Bock joined Kimberley-based side  for the 2016 and 2017 seasons.

Southern Kings

References

External links 
 

South African rugby union players
Living people
1982 births
Boland Cavaliers players
Griquas (rugby union) players
Western Province (rugby union) players
SWD Eagles players
People from Wellington, Western Cape
South Africa international rugby sevens players
Southern Kings players
Eastern Province Elephants players